Cryptostylis leptochila, commonly known as the small tongue orchid, is a species of orchid that is endemic to eastern Australia. It has one to a few broad leaves and up to fifteen green flowers with a dark red labellum that has a black stripe and rows of black dots either side of the stripe. As with others in the genus, it is pollinated by male ichneumon wasps.

Description
The upper surface of the leaves is green but the lower side is reddish purple. The sepals and petals are linear, greenish or yellowish and spread stiffly apart. The labellum is dark red, linear to oblong, cup-shaped around the column with its edges rolled under and the end suddenly turned downwards. The surface of the labellum is densely covered with glandular hairs. Flowering occurs from November to May and the flowers are pollinated by male Lissopimpla excelsa wasps when they attempt to mate with them.

Taxonomy and naming
Cryptostylis leptochila was first formally described in 1873 by George Bentham from an unpublished description by Ferdinand von Mueller. The description was published in Flora Australiensis. The specific epithet (leptochila) is derived from the Ancient Greek words  meaning "fine", "small", "thin" or "delicate", and  meaning "lip".

Distribution and habitat
The small tongue orchid grows in forest, usually in high rainfall areas. It is found in south-eastern Queensland, on the coast and ranges of New South Wales, in southeastern Victoria and on Flinders Island.

Conservation
This species is classed as "endangered" in Tasmania, where it occurs in a few locations on Flinders Island but is not in any nature reserve. The main threats to the species are inappropriate fire regimes and land clearing. It is listed under the Tasmanian Threatened Species Protection Act 1995.

References 

leptochila
Orchids of New South Wales
Orchids of Victoria (Australia)
Orchids of Tasmania
Plants described in 1873